Arry is the name of the following communes in France:

 Arry, Moselle, in the Moselle department
 Arry, Somme, in the Somme department

'Arry is also a nickname, an example of H dropping in the name Harry. Those with such a nickname include:
 Harry Redknapp, former English footballer and football manager
 Harry Potter, the main character of the Harry Potter series, by the Delacour family.